The Transylvanian Carpathians may refer to:

 Eastern Transylvanian Carpathians, a designation for the Eastern Romanian Carpathians
 Southern Transylvanian Carpathians, a designation for the Southern Romanian Carpathians
 Western Transylvanian Carpathians, a designation for the Western Romanian Carpathians

See also
 Romanian Carpathians
 Carpathian Mountains
 Carpathian (disambiguation)
 Transylvania (disambiguation)
 Transylvanian (disambiguation)